Duchnice  is a village in the administrative district of Gmina Ożarów Mazowiecki, within Warsaw West County, Masovian Voivodeship, in east-central Poland. It lies approximately  14 km west from the center of Warsaw.

Duchnice has a population of 858.

References

Duchnice